Leith Roads is a stretch of water off the coastal town of Leith, Scotland. The waters extend about two miles (3 km) offshore and provide a generally safe anchor, protected from the gales as they are, by Inchkeith.

The English landscape painter J. M. W. Turner drew a pair of sketches in 1822 entitled Shipping in Leith Roads which are part of the Tate's collection.

References

Firth of Forth
Leith